David Robert Grimes (born 1985) is an Irish science writer with professional training in physics and cancer biology, who contributes to several media outlets on questions of science and society. He has a diverse range of research interests and is a vocal advocate for increased public understanding of science. He was the 2014 recipient of the Sense about Science/Nature Maddox Prize for "Standing up for Science in the face of Adversity". He is a fellow with the Committee for Skeptical Inquiry.

Early life 
David Robert Grimes, from a Skerries family, was born in Dublin in 1985. Grimes spent over a decade in Riyadh, Saudi Arabia. As a student he was a keen musician and actor, with an interest in science. He undertook his undergraduate degree in applied physics at DCU, serving on the Student Union as faculty-wide Science and Health Convenor 2005–2006, and on the DCU drama committee, graduating in 2007 with a DCU Internal School Award, the Lyman Medal for physics.

Professional biography

Grimes did doctoral work on ultraviolet radiation physics at Dublin City University funded by an Irish Research Council award, under Neil O'Hare and Greg Hughes, and graduated with a Ph.D. in 2011. He did a postdoctoral fellowship at the University of Oxford with Mike Partridge, and focused on medical physics and oncology, including a 2015 research work on oxygen-radiation interactions (the "oxygen fixation hypothesis and oxygen enhancement ratio")—about which he blogged—and literature reviews on modelling tumour oxygen distribution and hypoxia in 2014 (which received media attention), and on non-invasive imaging in 2017.

As of January 2018, Grimes had worked with Centre for Advanced and Interdisciplinary Radiation Research (CAIRR), and the School of Mathematics and Physics, Queen's University Belfast, in Belfast, United Kingdom.

As of 2022, Grimes is a fellow with the Committee for Skeptical Inquiry.

Other research interests
He has a number of other research interests, including with regard to dubious beliefs in general; a 2016 research analysis of common scientific conspiracy claims was performed using a Poisson statistical framework. The work suggests that massive conspiracies should quickly collapse, and was widely covered in the media. His writing includes consideration of dubious medical practices, including a 2012 review piece critical of homoeopathic claims, presented from a physics perspective.

Science outreach 
Grimes is best known for science journalism and outreach, and has contributed to numerous publications, including Irish Times, The Guardian, the  BBC, and other outlets. His pieces focus on aspects of science and society, as well as debunking pseudoscience on topics that can be controversial in the public mind, such as vaccination, climate-change, gun control, nuclear power, public health and scientific misconceptions.

Grimes has advocated secularism in the Irish education system. He criticised Irish religious conservatives for misrepresenting the research on abortion and same-sex marriage for political purposes, acknowledging that, while they were entitled to ethical misgivings, their policy of "misrepresenting research... to bolster religious views is a transparently cynical exercise". The piece claiming misrepresented research prompted a strong rebuttal from John Murray, also in The Irish Times, that took Grimes to task, claiming various factual and interpretive errors in his piece.

Fluoride and cannabis campaigns 

Grimes has been critical of anti-fluoride campaigns, in particular a 2013 Sinn Féin bill to ban  fluoride in water. This stance made him the target of conspiracy theorists, and prompted a campaign to have him removed from his university post. The bill was ultimately defeated.

Grimes has also been  publicly critical  of a medicinal cannabis campaign by People Before Profit,  specifically cure-all claims made by representatives of the campaign. He has particularly criticised dubious claims linking cannabis to cures for cancer and autism, saying that these positions are not supported by the evidence and could put patients at risk.

Criticism of anti-vaccine movement and false balance 

Grimes has been particularly  vocal against the anti-vaccine movement, focusing on assertions by anti-HPV vaccine groups whose arguments,  Grimes says, consist of "anecdotes, emotive appeals and easily debunked assertions", opining that "lives of countless young men and women count on us being guided by evidence rather than rhetoric." In 2016, following controversy around the film Vaxxed, Grimes was drawn into a debate with former doctor Andrew Wakefield on Irish radio. Grimes later wrote of his reluctance to take part in the debate, and how providing Wakefield with any  platform is false balance. He was  extremely critical of the decision by Regent's University to host Wakefield, explaining that  "Wakefield is a long-debunked fear merchant." 

Grimes  was also part of a subsequent successful campaign to have screenings of the movie pulled in both London and at the European parliament.

Advocating for evidence-based medicine 

Grimes has drawn attention to charlatans who take advantage of vulnerable people using pseudoscience, particularly autistic people and cancer sufferers. Equally, he has been vocal about crowdfunding for dubious medical conditions and clinics, such as the Burzynkski clinic in Texas, US, stating that while emotive, "... raising money for such causes does not help sufferers one iota – it benefits only those with the audacity to push false hope at great expense.".

Grimes has written at length about questionable treatments for conditions such as electromagnetic hypersensitivity which, evidence suggests, is a psychological rather than physiological illness, criticising clinics who claim to offer cures for the ailment. Grimes has been particularly critical of homoeopathy, both in academic work and in popular press, which has led to angry responses from homoeopaths.

Public understanding of science 

Grimes states that a major challenge in communicating about science is not strictly information deficit but rather ideological bias,  and that motivated reasoning is a vital factor to acknowledge. To support this claim, he points to the evidence that political leanings influence whether one accepts the scientific consensus on climate change. Similarly, he has argued, both in popular media and academically, that acceptance of nuclear power,  gun control and vaccination is strongly influenced by ideological beliefs. Grimes argues that overcoming our implicit biases and gaining a better understanding of the scientific method would improve our decision making and benefit both society and individuals.

Awards and honours 
In recognition of his efforts to present science despite hostility, Grimes was joint recipient of the 2014 Sense about Science / Nature Maddox Prize for standing up for science in the face of adversary, and was commended by Cancer Research UK for being "... an excellent media ambassador for CRUK, and for his efforts to dispel misconceptions in science and medicine". In 2015, he was  also inducted into the Dublin  City University Alumni Wall for his research and outreach work.

Published works

Popular works

Books
  Also published as Good Thinking: Why Flawed Logic Puts Us All at Risk and How Critical Thinking Can Save the World. in North America.

References

External links 

 Grimes staff page at Oxford. 
 Grimes's personal blog.
 David Robert Grimes Youtube Channel.

1985 births
Date of birth missing (living people)
Alumni of Dublin City University
Critics of alternative medicine
Irish physicists
Living people
Journalists from Dublin (city)
John Maddox Prize recipients